Bugesera International Airport  is an airport in the Bugesera District of Rwanda under construction since 2017.

Location
Bugesera Airport is located in southeastern Rwanda, in Bugesera District, near the town of Rilima. The approximate coordinates of Bugesera International Airport are: 02°08'09.0"S, 30°11'00.0"E (Latitude:-2.135833; Longitude:30.183333).

Planning phase, 2010-2016
In November 2010, press reports indicated that the Rwanda government had retained the international accounting firm PricewaterhouseCoopers to provide financial advice and lead the search for funding the project. The government wanted to develop Bugesera Airport as a public-private-partnership project.

As of 2014, Bugesera International Airport was planned to become Rwanda's largest International Airport, serving commercial flights destined to and from the greater Kigali metropolitan area to become Rwanda's third international airport, the country's 8th airport overall and to complement Kigali International Airport, which as of 2014 was operating at maximum capacity. Until 2014, 2000 families were expropriated. 

In September 2016, the government of Rwanda signed a binding agreement with Mota-Engil of Portugal to fund, build and operate a new airport for 25 years under concession from the government, with the contract renewable for an additional 15 years. Mota-Engil agreed to provide the $418 million to fund the first phase of construction. Commercial operations were expected to begin in 2018.
The airport was to initially have a single paved runway and during the second phase of construction, a second runway was to be added. The estimated cost for Phase I to be completed in 2018 was US$418 million, while Phase II was budgeted to cost US$382 million, for a total of US$800 million. As of 2018, the British engineering firm,  TPS Consult Plc. was commissioned to carry out a feasibility study and design the new airport.

Construction, 2017-present
In August 2017, construction began with a doubling of projected cost at US$828 million. Mota-Engil, through its subsidiary Mota-Engil Africa, was the main contractor and to provide 75 percent of the funding. Rwandan company Aviation Travel and Logistics (ATL) was providing the remaining 25 percent of the funding and to provide ground handling services at the airport. Completion of the first phase was expected in 2019. 

In April 2019, construction was halted to pave way for a redesign.

In December 2019, Qatar Airways agreed to continue the project, with a much larger airport being planned, at a construction budget of US$1.31 billion. As of April 2019, the new airport would be able to handle one million passengers and 150 million tonnes of cargo annually during its first phase. Bugesera International Airport would have a 30,000-square-metre passenger terminal with 22 check-in counters, ten gates, and six passenger boarding bridges. In December 2019, Qatar Airways agreed to take a 60 percent stake in the airport. As per the Rwanda Development Board, the first phase of 5 years construction would provide facilities for seven million passengers a year. The second phase, expected to be completed by 2032, would increase the capacity to 14 million passengers a year.

See also

References

External links
 Artistic Impression of Bugesera International Airport
 Website of Rwanda Civil Aviation Authority
 Rwanda: Ten Things We Know About the Rwanda-Qatar Airways Deal As of 10 December 2019.

Airports in Rwanda
Bugesera District
Buildings and structures in Kigali
Proposed airports in Africa
Proposed transport infrastructure in Rwanda